The John C. Green School of Science, endowed by John Cleve Green, was built in September 1873 located near the corner of Nassau Street and Washington Road in Princeton, New Jersey.  It housed the science department of the College of New Jersey (the original name of Princeton University).  On November 26, 1928, it was destroyed by a fire.

Gallery

References

External links
 John C. Green School of Science

Princeton University buildings